Welcome to The Captain (previously known as The Captain) is an American sitcom television series created, executive produced and directed by John Hamburg. Andrew Reich and Ted Cohen also serve as executive producers. The show is about a young writer (Fran Kranz) whose life changes when he moves into a legendary old Hollywood apartment building.

Produced by CBS Paramount Network Television and John & Anders, the series was greenlit and given a six-episode order in June 2007.

Welcome to The Captain premiered on February 4, 2008, airing on Monday nights at 8:30pm Eastern Time on CBS in the United States and CTV in Canada. On CBS it was a mid-season replacement for The Big Bang Theory, but the show was halted after its fifth episode aired due to poor ratings. Fran Kranz eventually signed on to the upcoming Fox series Dollhouse, effectively canceling the CBS sitcom. On May 14, 2008, the series was officially canceled.

Cast
Fran Kranz – Joshua "Josh" Flug
Chris Klein – Marty Tanner
Joanna Garcia – Hope
Al Madrigal – Jesus
Valerie Azlynn – Astrid
Raquel Welch – Charlene Van Ark
Jeffrey Tambor – Saul Fish

Guest stars

Episodes

U.S. Nielsen Ratings

Weekly

Seasonal

References

External links

Television series by CBS Studios
CBS original programming
2008 American television series debuts
2008 American television series endings
2000s American single-camera sitcoms
Television shows set in Los Angeles
English-language television shows